Shahriar Mandanipour (also Shahriar Mondanipour(February 15, 1957), Shiraz, Iran, is an Iranian writer, journalist and literary theorist.

Mandanipour was born and raised in Shiraz, Iran. In 1975 he moved to Tehran and studied Political Sciences at the University of Tehran, graduating in 1980. In 1981, he enlisted in the army for his military service. To experience war and to write about it, he volunteered to join the front during the Iran-Iraq war and served there as an officer for eighteen months.

Following his military service, Mandanipour returned to Shiraz where he worked as director of the Hafiz Research Center and director of the National Library of Fars. In 1998, he became chief editor of Asr-e Panjshanbeh (Thursday Evening), a monthly literary journal.

In 2006, Mandanipour traveled to the United States as an International Writers Project Fellow at Brown University. In 2007 and 2008 he was a writer in residence at Harvard University and in 2009 at Boston College. In September 2011, Mandanipour returned to Brown University as a visiting professor of literary arts where he currently teaches contemporary Persian literature and modern Iranian cinema. He is currently a Professor of the Practice at Tufts University.

Works
Mandanipour started writing at the age of fourteen and published his first short story, Shadows of the Cave, in 1985 in the literary journal Mofid Magazine. In 1989, his first collection of short stories was published under the same title.

Regarded as one of the most accomplished and promising writers of contemporary Iranian literature, Mandanipour's creative approach to the use of symbols and metaphors, his inventive experimentation with language, time and space, as well as his unique awareness of sequence and identity have made his work fascinating to critics and readers alike. In his stories, Mandanipour creates his own unique surreal world in which illusion seems as real as terrifying reality. The nightmares and realisms of his stories are rooted in the historical horrors and sufferings of the people of Iran.

At the outset, Mandanipour's stories are enigmatic, yet they jolt awake the reader's imagination and provoke him or her to peel away the intricately woven and fused layers in which past and present, and tradition and modernity collide. His characters do not conform to conventional molds. Traditional identities are blurred as the lines between right and wrong, friend and foe, sanity and insanity become fluid. Often driven by the most basic human instincts of fear, survival and loneliness, Mandanipour's characters struggle in a world of contradictions and ambiguities and grapple with self-identity, social dilemmas, and everyday life.

In a collection of essays on creative writing, The Book of Shahrzad's Ghosts (Ketab-e Arvāh-e Shahrzād), Mandanipour discusses the elements of the story and the novel, as well as his theories on the nature of literature and the secrets of fiction.  He writes, "Literature is the alchemy of transforming reality into words and creating a new phenomenon called fictional reality."

His novel The Courage of Love (Del-e Del Dadegi), published in 1998, is structured around a love quadrangle with the four main characters representing earth, fire, water, and wind. Events in the novel take place during two different periods of war and earthquake. By placing the two timeframes laterally, like mirrors facing each other, Mandanipour compares the devastation, savagery, futility, and the dark consequences of war and earthquake. In the novel, Mandanipour employs stream of consciousness. Numerous critics, including Houshang Golshiri, have regarded the 900-page work of fiction as a masterpiece of contemporary Iranian literature. In 2008, he cooperated in the writing the screenplay of a documentary named Chahar Marge Yek Nevisandeh (Four Deaths of a Writer). It is the life of a writer showing how he dies four times in his works and the screenplay was directed by Ali Zare Ghanat Nowi.

In 2009, Mandanipour published Censoring an Iranian Love Story, his first novel to be translated into English. Ostensibly a tale of romance, the book delves deeply into themes of censorship as the author struggles, in the text, with writing a love story that he'll be able to get past Iran's Ministry of Culture and Islamic Guidance's Office of Censorship to publish an account of life in post-Islamic Revolution Iran.

In the novel two narratives are intertwined. In one, we read of the difficulties, fears and trepidations that surround the meeting of a young couple in modern-day Iran at a time when gender separation is forcefully imposed on society. Scene by scene we become more familiar with the struggles they face in preserving their love and the creative schemes they contrive to lessen the risk of discovery and arrest. In a parallel storyline, Mandanipour enters as his own alter ego and takes us along as he composes each sentence and scene, revealing his frustrations and his methods of battling against censorship. The sentences that the writer self-censors appear as strikethroughs in the text. The writer's comical efforts at surmounting censorship and advancing his story resemble the struggles of the young lovers to preserve their love.

Translated into English by Sara Khalili, Censoring an Iranian Love Story was well received by critics worldwide. The New Yorker named it one of the Reviewers' favorites from 2009, and National Public Radio listed it as one of The Best Debut Fictions of 2009.

In his review for The New Yorker, James Wood wrote, "Mandanipour's writing is exuberant, bonhomous, clever, profuse with puns and literary-political references."[2]   For The New York Times, Michiko Kakutani wrote, "Some of Mr. Mandanipour's efforts to inject his story with surreal, postmodern elements feel distinctly strained (the intermittent appearances of a hunchbacked midget, in particular, are annoyingly gratuitous and contrived), but he's managed, by the end of the book, to build a clever Rubik's Cube of a story, while at the same time giving readers a haunting portrait of life in the Islamic Republic of Iran: arduous, demoralizing and constricted even before the brutalities of the current crackdown." And writing in the Los Angeles Times, Susan Salter Reynolds commented, "Censorship, seen as its own art form, is just another way of messing with reality. It's hard enough to generate one's own ideas without having someone else's superimposed over them, but the fictional Mandanipour tries ... He writes a love story that is convincingly, achingly impossible in a place where men and women cannot even look at each other in public. The effect (as every good Victorian understood) is deliriously sensual prose."

Awards
In 1994, Mandanipour was named Best Film Critique at the Press Festival in Tehran. In 1998, he received the Golden Tablet Award for best fiction of the past 20 years in Iran. In 2004, he won the Mehregan Award for the best Iranian children's novel. In 2010, he was awarded The Athens Prize for Literature for his novel Censoring an Iranian Love Story.

Bibliography
 Censoring an Iranian Love Story, Alfred A. Knopf, Random House, 2009. (Also translated and published in Italian, French, Dutch, German, Portuguese, Spanish, Catalan, Polish, Greek, and Korean.)
Moon Brow, Restless Books, 2018.
Seasons of Purgatory, Bellevue Literary Press, January 2022.

Published in Iran (in Persian):
 One Thousand and One Years, Afarinegan Publishing, Tehran, 2nd ed., 2004 (book for young adults)
 Ultramarine Blue, Nashr-e Markaz Publishing, Tehran, 2003; 4th ed., 2007
 Violet Orient, Nashr-e Markaz Publishing, Tehran, 1999; 8th ed., 2009
 The Courage of Love (2 vol.), Zaryab Publications, Tehran, 1998; 2nd ed., 2000
 The Shadows of the Cave, Navid Publications, Shiraz, 1989; 2nd ed., Hamrah Publications, Tehran, 2001
 The Secret, Soroosh Press, Tehran, 1997; 2nd ed., 2000 (children's book)
 Midday Moon, Nashr-e Markaz Publishing, Tehran, 1997; 2nd ed., 2003; 5th ed., 2009
 Mummy and Honey, Niloofar Publications, Tehran, 1997; 2nd ed., 2001
 The Eighth Day of the Earth, Niloofar Publications, Tehran, 1992
 The Book of Shahrzad's Ghost (essays on creative writing), Qoqnoos Publishing, Tehran, 2004; 2nd ed., 2005

Short stories in translation published in literary journals:
 "Mummy and Honey," Words without Borders, November 2010
 "If You Didn't Kill the Cuckoo Bird," The Virginia Quarterly Review, Summer 2010
 "Seven Captains," The Kenyon Review, Summer 2009
 "Seasons of Purgatory," The Literary Review, Fall 2007

Several short stories have also been translated into French, German, Kurdish, and Arabic.

Short stories in translation published in anthologies:
 "The Color of Fire at Midday", Sohrab's Wars, Mazda Publishers, Inc., 2008
  "Shatter the Stone Tooth", Strange Times, My Dear: The PEN Anthology of Contemporary Iranian Literature, Arcade Publishing, 2005
 "Kolacja cyprysu i ognia", (Dinner of the Cypress and Fire) Kolacja cyprysu i ognia. Współczesne opowiadania irańskie, selected and rendered into Polish by Ivonna Nowicka, Krajowa Agencja Wydawnicza, Warszawa, 2003
 Berliner Träume/Auszug aus dem Berliner Tagebuch, Zwischen Berlin und Beirut (anthology), Verlag C.H.Beck, Munchen, 2007
 Neue Literatur aus dem Iran, Haus der Kulturen der Welt (The House of World Culture), Berlin, 2000
 "Le Huitième Jour de la terre", Les Jardins de Solitude, Editions Mille et Une Nuits, Department de la Librairie Arthem, Fayard, Paris, Nov. 2000
 Naqd, Tidsskrift for Mellemθstens Litteratur, Copenhagen, 1998

Essays:
 "Le jour ou le printemps iranien refleurira," Le Temp, Switzerland, April 2011
 "Das Kapital," Bound to Last (a collection of essays,) Da Capo Press, 2010
 "In Iran Today, Generation Must Speak to Generation," Guardian, 2009
 "The Life of a Word," PEN America: A Journal for Writers and Readers /8 Making Histories, New York 2008

See also
 Akbar Sahraei

References

Iranian male novelists
Iranian novelists
Iranian essayists
Living people
People from Shiraz
1957 births
Iranian male short story writers